The women's discus throw at the 1966 European Athletics Championships was held in Budapest, Hungary, at Népstadion on 31 August and 1 September 1966.

Medalists

Results

Final
1 September

Qualification
31 August

Participation
According to an unofficial count, 14 athletes from 9 countries participated in the event.

 (1)
 (1)
 (2)
 (3)
 (2)
 (1)
 (1)
 (1)
 (2)

References

Discus throw
Discus throw at the European Athletics Championships
Euro